Staats is a surname of German and Dutch origin and a given name.

Surname
Notable people with this surname include:
 Abraham Staats (born 1620), Dutch settler
 Alfred Staats (1891-1915), German gymnast
 Barent Staats (born 1796), American politician
 Brad Staats (born 1975), American politician
 Craig Staats, American politician
 Dewayne Staats (born 1952), American sports broadcaster
 Elmer B. Staats (1914-2011), American public servant
 Johnny Staats, American musician
 Léo Staats (1877-1952), French dancer
 Peter Staats, American physician

Given name
 Staats Long Morris (1728-1800), American colonist

References